Rolf Beck (15 January 1945) is a German conductor, especially a choral conductor. He was, from 1999 to 2013, Intendant of the Schleswig-Holstein Musik Festival.

Career 
Born in Michelstadt, Beck studied law at the Marburg University and Lausanne University.

From 1996 he was director of the sections orchestra and choir for the broadcaster Norddeutscher Rundfunk. He was Intendant of the Schleswig-Holstein Musik Festival from 1999 to 2013. In 2013 he conducted with the festival choir and orchestra a charity concert of the President of Germany, Joachim Gauck, featuring Verdi's  and Rossini's . He founded a Chorakademie as part of the festival, a place of study and performance for young international singers. After retiring, he kept directing the academy under the new name Internationale Chorakademie Lübeck (International Choral Academy Lübeck). He founded in 2015 a choral academy in Brazil, performing first Carl Orff's Carmina burana. With the Lübeck academy, he conducted four of Bach's motets for the Rheingau Musik Festival at St. Stephan, Mainz on 27 August 2015.

References

External links 
 
 

German male conductors (music)
Choral conductors
1945 births
Living people
University of Marburg alumni
University of Lausanne alumni
Frankfurt University of Music and Performing Arts alumni
Recipients of the Cross of the Order of Merit of the Federal Republic of Germany
21st-century German conductors (music)
21st-century German male musicians
Norddeutscher Rundfunk people